Maine School Administrative District 6 (MSAD 6) is an operating school district within Maine, covering the towns of Buxton, Hollis, Standish, Limington, and Frye Island.

Schools

High schools
 Bonny Eagle High School (Standish)

Middle schools
Bonny Eagle Middle School (Buxton)

Elementary schools
Buxton Center Elementary School (Buxton)
Edna Libby Elementary School (Standish) 
George E Jack School (Standish) 
H B Emery Junior Memorial School (Limington) 
Hollis Elementary School (Hollis) 
Steep Falls Elementary School (Standish)

External links

06
Education in York County, Maine
Education in Cumberland County, Maine
Buxton, Maine
Standish, Maine